The 2021 CAF Women's Champions League UNIFFAC Qualifiers is the 1st edition of the UNIFFAC women's club football qualifier tournament organised by the UNIFFAC for the women's clubs of association nations. This edition was held from 1 to 29 August 2021 in the away and home games. The final is playing in one game format in Malabo. The winners of the tournament qualified for the 2021 CAF Women's Champions League final tournament held in Egypt.

Participating teams

The following three teams will contest in the qualifying tournament. Wadi Degla SC from Egypt is the 2021 Egyptian League champions and he qualified automatiquely as the hosts of the final tournament.

Qualifying tournament

Semi finals

Final

Statistics

Goalscorers

References

2021 CAF Women's Champions League
Women's Champions League
CAF